Alberto Jorge Mariotti (born 23 August 1935) is a former Argentine association football player.

Mariotti plied his trade with Argentine clubs Chacarita Juniors (with whom he won the Primera B in 1959), San Lorenzo and Argentinos Juniors. In total he played a total of 131 matches in the Argentine league, without scoring a single goal.

While at San Lorenzo Páez was called up to the Argentina squad for the 1962 FIFA World Cup in Chile, where they were eliminated in the group stage. However, he was an unused substitute at the tournament and did not appear in any matches.

External links
 Alberto Mariotti at BDFA.com.ar 

1935 births
Living people
Argentine footballers
Argentina international footballers
1962 FIFA World Cup players
Argentine Primera División players

Association football defenders